Kansas City Southern de México, S.A. de C.V.  is a Mexican railroad and operating subsidiary of Kansas City Southern (KCS). The company was founded in 1996 as Transportación Ferroviaria Mexicana , a joint venture between KCS and Transportación Maritima Mexicana after the companies won a concession from the Mexican government to operate the  Northeast Railroad connecting Monterrey and Mexico City with a US port of entry at Laredo, Texas and seaports at Lázaro Cárdenas and Veracruz. In 2005, KCS bought out its partner's shares in the railroad, giving it full control.

Canadian Pacific Railway has been approved to purchase and merge with KCS, creating a combined railroad that will be the first and only to directly serve Canada, Mexico and the United States. The merger will take place as soon as April 14, 2023.

History 

Kansas City Southern de México was originally formed in 1996 when Kansas City Southern Industries and Transportación Maritima Mexicana (TMM) purchased a government concession to operate on a rail system in Mexico. It was the Mexican President, Ernesto Zedillo, who proposed the privatization of the Mexican railways because the Mexican railway system had fallen into a state of disrepair and needed drastic work to become profitable. Since the late 1930s, Mexican trains and tracks were the property of the government as Ferrocarriles Nacionales de México (Mexican National Railways). When the decision to privatize the railroad was made, only 15% of freight was moved by rail in Mexico (versus 42% in the US).

The most sought-after portion of the concessions, called the Northeast Railroad, was bid on by many major companies, including the United States' largest railroad company, Union Pacific Railroad. This track carried 46% of all rail traffic in Mexico and 60% of all freight coming from the United States. KCSM and TMM bid and won the concession for US$1.4 billion for the rights to operate the concession, paying 49% and 51% respectively.

In 2005, Kansas City Southern Industries purchased Transportacion Maritima Mexicana's share in TFM, giving them full ownership of the company, and the TFM was officially renamed Kansas City Southern de Mexico.

11 of 14 of Mexico's auto assembly plants, plus two more under construction, are located on the railroad. Automobile traffic (autos and parts) accounted for 9% of the 2012 total carloads.

Key connections 
 Guadalajara
 Laredo, Texas – United States port of entry
 Lázaro Cárdenas – Pacific Ocean port
 México City – served by Ferrovalle, a terminal railroad co-owned by KCSM
 Monterrey
 Queretaro
 Saltillo
 San Luis Potosí
 Tampico
 Veracruz – Atlantic Ocean port

See also 

 Kansas City Southern Railway
 Rail transport in Mexico
 Railroad classes

References

Further reading

External links 

 

Railway companies of Mexico
Kansas City Southern Railway
Privatized companies in Mexico
Standard gauge railways in Mexico
1997 establishments in Mexico